The Solituderennen (eng: Solitude race) motorsport events are held on the 11.4 km Solitudering race track near Stuttgart. The event and the track were named after the nearby Castle Solitude. Motorsports events were held there from 1903 to 1965.

Due to the narrow track, initially mainly motorcycle events were held there until 1956. The track and the pits were widened in early 1957 and sports car racing was staged by the automobile club ADAC.

Grand Prix motorcycle racing events were held at the track from 1952 to 1964, with the German motorcycle Grand Prix taking place there in even-numbered years: 1952, 1954, 1956, 1958, 1960, 1962 and 1964.

From 1961 to 1964, non-Championship Formula One Grand Prix races were also held, in addition to previous Formula 2 and Formula Junior events.

In 2003, a memorial event was held, with many former participants and vehicles.

Winners (incomplete)

Großer Preis der Solitude

Motorcycle

50 ccm 
1964: Ralph Bryans, Honda

125 ccm 
1964: Jim Redman, Honda

250 ccm 
1925: Josef Stelzer, BMW
1926: Josef Stelzer, BMW
1964: Phil Read, Yamaha (WC)

350 ccm 
1964:

500 ccm 
1925: Rudolf Reich, BMW
1964: Mike Hailwood, MV Agusta (WC)

750 ccm 
1926: Karl Raebel, BMW

1,000 ccm 
1926: Paul Köppen, BMW

Sidecar 
1964: Scheidegger/Robinson, BMW

External links 
 Solitude Memorial Site
 Solitude Memorial Event 2003

 
Grand Prix motorcycle circuits
Buildings and structures in Stuttgart
Sports venues in Baden-Württemberg
Defunct motorsport venues in Germany